Kevin Short (born March 23, 1992) is a former American football cornerback. He played Professional Arena football this past spring with RGV Dorados (2019). He signed a contract (2020) with the defending champs of the NAL, West Virginia RoughRiders. He played college football at Fort Scott Community College. He transferred to the University of Kansas but withdrew before playing there. Kevin also has 2 years of coaching collegiate sports ( Football ). Feather River Community College in 2017 and also Mansfield University in 2018, where he was the Head Secondary and Return specialist for both school programs.

Professional career

Kansas City Chiefs
On July 10, 2015, Short signed with the Kansas City Chiefs as an undrafted free agent. On September 5, 2015, he was waived by the Chiefs.

Seattle Seahawks
On September 7, 2015, Short was signed to the Seahawks' practice squad. On November 16, 2015, he was released.

New York Jets
On November 19, 2015, Short was signed to the New York Jets' practice squad.

Short signed a futures contract on January 5, 2016. On September 3, 2016, he was released by the Jets as part of final roster cuts.

Los Angeles Rams
On December 19, 2016, Short was signed to the Rams' practice squad. He signed a reserve/future contract with the Rams on January 3, 2017. On April 19, 2017, Short was waived by the Rams.

West Texas Warbirds
On October 19, 2022, Short signed with the West Texas Warbirds of the National Arena League (NAL). On February 13, 2023, Short retired from professional football.

References

External links
Fort Scott Greyhounds bio

1992 births
American football cornerbacks
Living people
People from Florissant, Missouri
Players of American football from Missouri
Kansas City Chiefs players
Seattle Seahawks players
New York Jets players
Los Angeles Rams players